Yunganastes mercedesae is a species of frog in the family Strabomantidae. It is found in Bolivia and southern Peru. It is sometimes known as Mercedes' robber frog. It is named after Mercedes S. Foster, who collected the holotype and was acknowledged for her herpetological collection efforts in South America.

Description
Yunganastes mercedesae is a beautiful frog with a striking colour pattern: the dorsum is medium brown with irregular, light green splotches and some black marks, and black eyestripe and lip marks. It is still known from relatively few individuals. Based on three adult males and two adult females, males measure  in snout–vent length, whereas females are much larger at  SVL.

Habitat
Yunganastes mercedesae is a rare frog inhabiting Andean cloud forest at moderate elevations (1400–1950 m).

References

mercedesae
Amphibians of Bolivia
Amphibians of Peru
Taxa named by John Douglas Lynch
Amphibians described in 1987
Taxonomy articles created by Polbot